Vladimir Georgievski (born October 18, 1982) is a retired Macedonian professional basketball player who last played for Karpoš Sokoli.

References

External links
 
 

1982 births
Living people
Macedonian men's basketball players
Sportspeople from Skopje
KK MZT Skopje players
Small forwards